Lesbian, gay, bisexual, and transgender (LGBT) persons in Gabon face legal challenges not experienced by non-LGBT residents. Except for a period between July 2019 and June 2020, same-sex sexual activity has never been illegal in Gabon.

Same-sex couples and households headed by same-sex couples are not eligible for the same legal protections available to opposite-sex couples and LGBT persons face stigmatization among the broader population.

In December 2008, Gabon co-sponsored and signed the non-binding UN declaration on sexual orientation and gender identity which called for the global decriminalization of homosexuality. It was one of only six African countries to do so. In 2011, however, Gabon voted against a joint statement on ending acts of violence and related human rights violations based on sexual orientation and gender identity" at the United Nations, a statement which was condemning violence and discrimination against LGBT people.

Laws regarding same-sex sexual activity 
Following the country's independence from France in 1960, and up to 2019, same-sex relationships have not been criminalized. The age of consent is not equal. Opposite-sex sexual acts requires a minimum age of 15, while same-sex sexual acts requires the minimum age of 21.

On 5 July 2019, Gabon enacted revisions to its Penal Code which criminalized homosexual relation between consenting adults with a potential penalty of imprisonment up to 6 months and/or a fine of up to 5 million CFA francs.
According to Davis Mac-Iyalla of the Interfaith Diversity Network of West Africa, he claimed he knew of two men in Gabon who had already been arrested under the law and had to bribe the police to be let go.
On 23 June 2020, the National Assembly approved the government's bill to decriminalize same-sex sexual activity. It was approved by the Senate on 29 June, and signed by the President on 7 July 2020.

Recognition of same-sex relationships 
There is no legal recognition of same-sex couples.

Discrimination protections 
There is no legal protection against discrimination based on sexual orientation or gender identity.

Living conditions 
The U.S. Department of State's 2010 Human Rights Report found that "discrimination and violence against lesbian, gay, bisexual, and transgender (LGBT) persons was a problem, and LGBT individuals often kept their status secret from the community for fear of being harassed or discriminated against".

Summary table

See also 

LGBT rights in Africa
Human rights in Africa

References 

LGBT in Gabon
Human rights in Gabon
Law of Gabon
Gabon
Politics of Gabon